This was the first edition of the tournament.

Joris De Loore won the title after defeating Filip Cristian Jianu 6–3, 6–2 in the final.

Seeds

Draw

Finals

Top half

Bottom half

References

External links
Main draw
Qualifying draw

Oeiras Indoors - 1